Sex trafficking in Singapore is human trafficking for the purpose of sexual exploitation and slavery that occurs in the Republic of Singapore. Singapore is primarily a destination country for sexually trafficked persons.

Trafficking process and victims
Sex trafficking victims in the country are from all ethnic groups in Singapore and foreigners. Singaporean citizens and foreigners, primarily women and girls, have been deceived, threatened, and forced into prostitution and unfree labour. They are often forced to wear revealing clothing and high heels. Many come from poverty and have little education. Perpetrators confiscate their passports and other documents and guard or lock-up the women and girls. Some force them to sign phony contracts in a foreign language they cannot read. Sex trafficked victims experience physical and psychological trauma. Abuse is prevalent and they contract sexually transmitted diseases from rapes without condoms. Malnutrition and food deprivation also occur. A number have depression and suicidal thoughts because of the trauma. Some are coerced to become sex traffickers themselves.

Extent
Sex trafficking and exploitation is not as big of a problem as it was back in the 1970s and 1980s, but it manifests in various forms throughout Singaporean society. Male and female perpetrators in Singapore come from diverse backgrounds. A number of traffickers are members of or facilitated by criminal syndicates and gangs. Perpetrators are increasingly using websites and messaging apps to lure victims.

Responses
The government of Singapore has been criticised for not having adequate victim protection efforts.

Hagar International carries out anti-sex trafficking efforts in Singapore.

References 

Crime in Singapore by type
Prostitution in Singapore
Women in Singapore
Malaysian women
Society of Singapore
Human rights abuses in Singapore
Singapore